Joshua Harry Ritchie (born 21 May 1994) is an English television personality. In 2015, he finished in third place in the first series of the ITV2 reality series Love Island alongside Lauren Richardson and later appeared on two series of Ex on the Beach.

Personal life
Ritchie is from Bolton. His sister is Michaela Wain, a candidate on the thirteenth series of The Apprentice. In 2018, Ritchie was in a relationship with Charlotte Crosby. According to media reports, they broke up on 17 November 2019.

Career
Ritchie was on the 2015 series of Love Island and the sixth and seventh series of Ex On The Beach. In 2018, Ritchie presented two episodes of Just Tattoo of Us alongside girlfriend Charlotte Crosby. In 2019, they were contestants on the fourth series of Celebrity Coach Trip. The pair came second. In 2020, Ritchie joined OnlyFans to upload X-rated content, which he discussed on Getting Filthy Rich with Olivia Attwood.

Filmography

References

External links
 
 Joshua Ritchie on Twitter
 Joshua Ritchie on Instagram

Living people
Love Island (2015 TV series) contestants
People from Bolton
Participants in British reality television series
1994 births
OnlyFans creators